Condorsenja or Condorshenga (possibly from Quechua kuntur condor, sinqa nose, "condor nose") is a mountain in the Raura mountain range in the Andes of Peru with  of elevation. It is located in the Lima Region, Oyón Province, Oyón District. Condorsenja lies south of the lakes T'inkiqucha and Puywanqucha and west of mount Santa Rosa.

References

Mountains of Peru
Mountains of Lima Region